The Argentine Ford Falcon is a car built by Ford Argentina from 1962 to 1991. Mechanically, it was based on the parent company's first generation Falcon. The Falcon retained the same body style throughout its production, with several substantial facelifts taking place during its lifespan, giving it a more European flavour and bringing it into line with other more contemporary Fords. However, several decades later, it was apparent that it was a 1960s design wearing a 1980s grille. Falcons are still raced in the Turismo Carretera stock car racing series.

The robust Ford Falcons became popular as black and yellow taxi cabs and white and blue police vehicles. They also had another connotation, with the dark green painted Falcons used by paramilitary government forces like the Argentine Anticommunist Alliance of the 1970s and the secret police of the military junta. The Ford Falcons used by the military were obtained through illegitimate means by people contracted outside of the military. The Ford Falcons would be repainted and had their license plates replaced in order to deliver the cars to the paramilitary government forces that used the vehicles for their clandestine operations during the Dirty War.

History

The story of the Falcon in Argentina began in 1961 when Ford Motor Argentina imported two Falcons from the US to test.

1962
In 1962, local production began with complete knock down kits imported from the US assembled at the Ford factory in La Boca. Only a sedan was offered, with Standard and Deluxe trim levels, and a 170 cubic inch Ford inline-six engine. The official unveiling of the Falcon to the country took place in the theater "Gran Rex" in February 1962.

1963
The first restyle of the Falcon came in 1963 and was produced until 1965. The Falcon now had a horizontal aluminum grill. New models included the Taxi model in 1964, and the more powerful Futura in 1965, with a vinyl roof and bucket seats. The first Futura left the production line on 4 December 1964. A larger and more powerful 187 c.i. (3,064 cc) engine was added with the Futura, offering . More parts were manufactured locally. In 1965, the Falcon became the best seller in the Argentinian market for the first time, reaching an 11.6% share of the market.

1966

The second restyling of 1966 brought a more ornate grill, hood and side panel ornamentation. Most parts were now locally produced. In late 1967, the new Falcon Rural station wagon model began production, with its own Futura and Deluxe variants. Unlike the North American Falcon wagon, the Argentinian Falcon Rural sat on the same wheelbase as the sedans. High compression engines producing more power were available from 1968, and in 1969 Ford introduced a higher performance 3.6-litre 132 hp engine that became available as an option (model 221XP), it employed a freer-breathing cylinder head and less restrictive exhaust system to boost power. A floor-mounted four-speed transmission became available for the first time.

1971
 
The third restyling of 1970 began drifting away from the original design as quad headlights were introduced on Deluxe and Futura models, new front and rear bumpers with vertical nudge bars and disc brakes with 14-inch wheels and low-aspect red-striped radial tyres are now available as options. The 188 and 221 cid engines were now standard. The Futura Rural station wagon was discontinued, instead replaced by the similarly equipped Falcon Rural Deluxe.

1973
By 1973, its fourth restyling, it drifted even more away from the original design, as it got a new redesigned dashboard with round instruments and tachometer on deluxe models, a new grill with several thick horizontal bars and quad headlights become squarer in design. A  sporting Falcon Sprint was introduced with new refreshing color schemes, painted stripes, 14-inch sports wheels and E70x14 red-striped Firestone Wide-Tread tires were standard and a higher performance 166 bhp (124.5 kW) specially tuned 3.6-litre (221 cid) engine, on the interior it included additional gauges and leather-covered sports steering wheel and leatherette bucket seats of exclusive design. The Deluxe trim of the Rural station wagon was dropped. A pickup, called the Ranchero, was introduced with Standard and Deluxe external trim and a heavy-duty brake option.

1978
 
The fifth restyling of 1978 brought further cosmetic changes, with another new grill this time in plastic, Ford's new oval logo emblems, new updated door handles, improved cabin ventilation with exhaust vents on the C pillar, single large rectangular headlights, and 175/70 R14 radial tyres on sporting or deluxe models, amongst several other changes.

1982

On its  sixth and last restyling, Ford tried to bring its design in line, as it was sold along its more modern "siblings", the Ford  Taunus, Sierra, and later the Escort. Changes include new bumpers with rubber strips and rubber end caps, new large rectangular taillights with amber turn signals, bronze-tinted glass replaced green, and a larger trunk by reconfiguring the trunk floor and repositioning the spare tyre, and other minor cosmetic changes. The Rural continued to use the original taillights. The Taxi and Sprint versions were dropped, and the Futura was changed into the Ghia. A 2.3-litre four-cylinder petrol engine was available, as was, as of 1988, a rare 2.4-litre diesel. The diesel, a  Italian-made VM HR492, was installed by Borward Puntana, but as they were unable to provide engines at the pace needed by Ford, the project soon came to a halt. Most of the diesels built were Ranchero pickups. The pickup truck, capable of a  max load, continued to be available with the 3.3- and 3.6-litre sixes, as well as the new four.

The 2.3 offered , while the smaller six has only , albeit with a higher torque and at a more leisurely engine speed. The unpopular (due to fuel economy worse than that of the 3-litre six) four-cylinder was available only with a four-speed manual, rather than the three-speed manual of the sixes. The four-cylinder was shared with the Argentinian-built Taunus and Sierras. The larger 3.6, the only engine available to the Ghia, has  except in the high-performance Ghia SP, where  were on tap due to twin carburettors. In 1989, the new Max Econo version of the 188 cid/3-litre engine became available, with better fuel economy at the cost of performance. Chrome was removed in 1990, and the Falcon was finally discontinued after 1991.

It reached about 98% of local parts integration.

Production

* Note: Not included in above chart are 33,493 station wagons (Falcon Rural) for a total of 494,209 Ford Falcons sold

See also
 Ford Falcon (North America)
 Ford Falcon (Australia)

References

External links

 Todo Falcon (fansite) 
 The open road, the dusty highway By Chris Moss on The Telegraph, 22 Oct 2005
 Fana Falcon (forum)  (archived, 25 Feb 2021)
 IMDB- Vida en Falcon (Living in a Falcon) (2005)

Ford Falcon
Falcon
Coupé utilities
Police vehicles
Cars of Argentina
Cars introduced in 1962
1970s cars
1980s cars
1990s cars
Cars discontinued in 1991